José Antonio Roca García (24 May 1928 – 4 May 2007) was a Mexican football player and manager.

Life and career
Born in Mexico City, Roca played football for Asturias F.C., Club Necaxa, Zacatepec and Atlante F.C.

After he retired from playing, Roca became a football manager, leading Club América for 173 matches during 1970 to 1975. He would also manage Club de Fútbol Laguna, Atlético Español, Tampico Madero, Atlas, Toluca, Club Necaxa, Atlante F.C. and Ángeles de Puebla.

International career
He played internationally with the Selección de fútbol de México, in three FIFA World Cup (1950, 1954 and 1958) tournaments as a player and one (1978) as manager.

References

External links

1928 births
2007 deaths
Footballers from Mexico City
Liga MX players
Club Necaxa footballers
Club Atlético Zacatepec players
Mexican football managers
Club América managers
Atlas F.C. managers
Deportivo Toluca F.C. managers
Club Necaxa managers
Mexico international footballers
Mexico national football team managers
1950 FIFA World Cup players
1954 FIFA World Cup players
1958 FIFA World Cup players
1978 FIFA World Cup managers
Mexican footballers
Association football defenders